Lassila (Finnish), Lassas (Swedish) is a neighborhood in western Helsinki, Finland. It was mostly developed in the 1980s and 1990s.

Haaga